Mamtesh Shakya is an Indian politician and a member of the Seventeenth Legislative Assembly of Uttar Pradesh in India. He represents the Patiyali constituency of Uttar Pradesh and is a member of the Bhartiya Janta Party.

Early life and education
Mamtesh Shakya was born in Etah district. He attended the M.U. Degree College and attained a Bachelor's degree.

Posts held

See also
 Amanpur (Assembly constituency)
 Sixteenth Legislative Assembly of Uttar Pradesh
 Uttar Pradesh Legislative Assembly

References 

Bahujan Samaj Party politicians from Uttar Pradesh
Uttar Pradesh MLAs 2007–2012
Uttar Pradesh MLAs 2012–2017
People from Etah district
1972 births
Living people
Bharatiya Janata Party politicians from Uttar Pradesh